Gara Abulfaz oghlu Garayev (February 5, 1918 – May 13, 1982), also spelled as Qara Qarayev or Kara Karayev, was a prominent Soviet Azerbaijani composer. Garayev wrote nearly 110 musical pieces, including ballets, operas, symphonic and chamber pieces, solos for piano, cantatas, songs, and marches, and rose to prominence not only in Azerbaijan SSR, but also in the rest of the Soviet Union and worldwide.

Early life
Garayev was born into a family of pediatricians, which was famous in Baku. His mother, Sona, was among the first graduates of the Baku-based school of the Russian Music Society. Garayev's younger brother, Mursal, became a surgeon and Doctor of Medicine.

In 1926, at the age of eight, Gara Garayev first entered the junior music school at the Azerbaijan State Conservatoire, currently known as the Baku Music Academy. Due to his musical talents, Garayev was allowed to enroll simultaneously in two faculties at the Azerbaijan State Conservatoire in 1933. Among his teachers were Georgi Sharoyev, Leonid Rudolf, and Uzeyir Hajibeyov. In 1937, Garayev joined the Union of Composers of Azerbaijan SSR.

Career
In 1938, at the age of twenty, Garayev composed his first musical piece, a cantata "The Song of the Heart" to the poem by Rasul Rza. It was performed in Moscow's Bolshoi Theater in the presence of Joseph Stalin in the same year. Garayev conducted his cantata during the Decade of Azerbaijani Art festival in the Bolshoi Theater, an event also attended by Stalin. In the same year, Garayev moved to the Moscow State Conservatoire, where he became a student and a good friend of Dmitri Shostakovich.

In 1941 Garayev returned to Baku to teach at Azerbaijan State Philharmonic Society. In 1945, both he and Jovdat Hajiyev wrote the Motherland ("Vətən") opera, for which they were awarded a prestigious Stalin Prize. In 1948, at the age of 30, Garayev was again awarded this prize for his symphonic poem Leyli and Majnun, based on the same-titled famous work of Nizami Ganjavi. Upon the death of Uzeyir Hajibeyov in 1948, Garayev became the Chair of the Union of Composers of Azerbaijan SSR and the rector of the Azerbaijan State Conservatoire. In this latter position, Garayev retained Uzeyir Hajibeyov's traditional emphasis on Azerbaijani folk music in teaching, and also promoted contemporary genres, such as jazz in Azerbaijani music. In 1948 Garayev also became the delegate to the First National USSR Congress of Soviet Composers. In the same year Garayev also headed the Music Department at the Azerbaijan Architecture and Art Institute.

In 1952, under the direction of the choreographer P. A. Gusev, Garayev's Seven Beauties ballet was staged at the Azerbaijani Theater of Opera and Ballet. Based on Nizami Ganjavi's famous poem, Seven Beauties ("Yeddi gözəl") opened a new chapter in the history of classical music of Azerbaijan. Garayev's only other ballet, Path of Thunder ("İldırımlı yollarla"), staged in 1958, was dedicated to racial conflicts in South Africa.<ref>Aida Huseinova. "Gara Garayev's 85th Jubilee", in Azerbaijan International, Vol. 11:1 (Spring 2003), p. 14</ref> In the same year, Garayev also wrote the score for the documentary film A Story About the Oil Workers of the Caspian Sea, directed by Roman Karmen and set at the Oil Rocks.

During his teaching career at the Azerbaijan State Conservatoire, Garayev tutored a number of prominent Azerbaijani musicians and composers, including Galib Mammadov, Arif Malikov, Khayyam Mirzazade and Ismayil Hajibeyov among others. Garayev's son, Faraj (born 1943), also became his student and went on to compose single-act ballets such as Shadows of Qobustan ("Qobustanın kölgələri") and Kaleidoscope, and later led the musical avant-garde movement in Azerbaijan.

During the Cold War in June 1961, Garayev and Tikhon Khrennikov were the only two Soviet composers who attended the first International Los Angeles Music Festival held at UCLA. The festival programmed works by fifteen composers from around the world, including Arnold Schoenberg and Igor Stravinsky. On June 11, Franz Waxman conducted the Festival Symphony Orchestra with a suite from Garayev's Path of Thunder.

In 1962 Garayev became a member of the Supreme Soviet of the USSR and visited the United States, Ethiopia, and Lebanon. In 1972 he visited Poland.

Later life

Garayev suffered from heart disease, which prevented him from attending his own 60th jubilee celebration held in Baku, where he was awarded the title of the Hero of Socialist Labor. Garayev spent the last five years of his life in Moscow, away from the public, although his love for Baku remained strong and was reflected in his writing:

Garayev died on May 13, 1982, in Moscow at the age of 64. His body was flown to Baku and buried at the Alley of Honor.

Appraisals

Dmitri Shostakovich, Russian composer and Garayev's mentor:

Niyazi, Azerbaijani conductor and composer:

Tahir Salahov, Azerbaijani painter:

Tikhon Khrennikov, Russian composer:

Rodion Shchedrin, Russian composer:

Fikret Amirov, Azerbaijani composer:

Khayyam Mirzazade, Azerbaijani composer and Garayev's student:

Imran Qasymov, Azerbaijani writer:

Arif Malikov, Azerbaijani composer and Garayev's student:

 Tribute to his memory  
The International Festival of Contemporary Music has been held since 1986 with the support of the Ministry of Culture of Azerbaijan.
 In memory of Gara Garayev:
 metro station in Baku
 an avenue in Baku
 a street in Imishli (city)
 Children's Music School No.75 in Moscow
 a ship
 A memorial plaque installed on the wall of Gara Garayev's house in Baku.
 In The 30th of February, the monument to Gara Garayev opened by President Ilham Aliyev in 28 May Street of Baku.
 A memorial board installed at Gara Garayev's house in Moscow. Where he lived between 1973 and 1982.

Major works

1942 - Film score for A Story About the Oil Workers of the Caspian Sea1943 - Symphony No. 1
1943 - Opera Motherland, with Jovdat Hajiyev, premiered in Baku in 1945
1947 - Symphonic poem Leyli and Majnun. Edited Muslim Magomayev's opera Shah Ismayil1948 – Seven Beauties, ballet
1949 - Seven Beauties, a suite for symphonic orchestra
1950 - Six children's pieces for piano
1952 - Albanian Rhapsody, children's pieces for piano
1957 - Path of Thunder ballet
1958 - Film score for Her Great Heart, three nocturnes for jazz orchestra
1960 - Don Quixote'', symphonic sketches
1960 - Sonata for violin and piano
1951-63 - 24 Preludes for piano 
1964 - Symphony No. 3
1967 - Violin Concerto

Honours and awards
 Hero of Socialist Labour (1978)
 Two Orders of Lenin (1967, 1978)
 Order of the October Revolution (1971)
 Order of the Red Banner of Labour (1961)
 Stalin Prize, twice (1946, 1948)
 Lenin Prize (1967)
 Azerbaijan SSR State Prize (1965)
Honoured Artist of the Azerbaijani SSR (1955)
 People's Artist of the Azerbaijani SSR (1958)
 People's Artist of the USSR (1959)

See also
List of People's Artists of the Azerbaijan SSR

References

External links 

 "Garayev: Forgotten Music Scores from Famous Composers," by Alla Bayramova, in Azerbaijan International, Vol. 11:1 (Spring 2003), pp. 16–17.
 Gara Garayev at http://www.musigi-dunya.az
 List of Garayev’s works from Onno van Rijen's Soviet Composers Page.
 Listen to Gara Garayev's works, Music Section of Azerbaijan International
 

1918 births
1982 deaths
Azerbaijani composers
Azerbaijani ballet composers
Azerbaijani film score composers
Azerbaijani professors
Azerbaijani music educators
Academic staff of the Baku Academy of Music
Heroes of Socialist Labour
People's Artists of the Azerbaijan SSR
People's Artists of the USSR
Recipients of the Order of Lenin
Stalin Prize winners
Lenin Prize winners
Soviet film score composers
Male film score composers
Soviet Azerbaijani people
Baku Academy of Music alumni
Burials at Alley of Honor
20th-century classical musicians
20th-century composers
20th-century male musicians
Honored Art Workers of the Azerbaijan SSR
Recipients of the Order of the Red Banner of Labour